Division 1 is the third level in the league system of Swedish women's football and, as of 2023, it has 3 sections with 14 football teams in each.

From 1978 to 1987, when the Damallsvenskan was created, it was the highest level of football in Sweden. Until 2013, when the Elitettan was created, it was the second highest level.

Current sections - 2023 season
The teams in the 2023 season were:

Div 1 Mellestra 
 BK Kenty
 Boo FF
 Degerfors IF
 Enskede IK
 Hertzöga BK
 Husqvarna FF
 P18 IK
 Rävåsens IK
 Segeltorps IF
 Smedby AIS
 Tyresö FF
 Västerås BK
 Älvsjö AIK FF
 Örebro SK FK

Div 1 Norra 
 Bele Barkarby FF
 Gefle IF FF
 Heffnersklubbans BK
 IFK Östersund
 IF Team Hudik
 IK Brage
 Kvarnsvedens IK
 Luleå Fotboll DFF
 Ope IF
 Sandvikens IF
 Själevads IK
 Sollentuna FK
 Sunnanå SK
 Team TG FF

Div 1 Södra 
 Eskilsminne DIF
 FC Rosengård B
 Halmstads BK
 IFK Göteborg
 IFK Värnamo
 IFK Örby
 IS Halmia
 Ljungskile SK
 Lödöse Nygärd IK
 Malmö FF
 Mariebo IK
 Onsala BK
 Södra Sandby IF
 Örgryte IS

Promoted teams

Tier 1

Tier 2

Tier 3
In bold, group champions are promoted to Elitettan.

Last updated: 14 March 2023 
Source:

External links 
Swedish Football Association (Svenska Fotbollförbundet) - Kontaktuppgifter och tävlingar
Leagues at women.soccerway.com; standings, results, fixtures

References

Summer association football leagues
3
1978 establishments in Sweden
Sports leagues established in 1978
Professional sports leagues in Sweden